The Nature's Best DVD is a DVD release of sixty music videos to songs from the three Nature's Best compilation albums. See the Nature's Best article for more details on the selection process of the songs.

Track listing
Dave Dobbyn - "Loyal" (Dave Dobbyn, 1988)
The Swingers - "Counting the Beat" (Phil Judd/Mark Hough/Wayne Stevens, 1981)
Bic Runga - "Sway" (Bic Runga, 1997)
Dave Dobbyn with Herbs - "Slice of Heaven" (Dave Dobbyn, 1986)
Dance Exponents - "Victoria" (Jordan Luck, 1982)
Dragon - "April Sun In Cuba" (Paul Hewson/Marc Hunter, 1978)
Split Enz - "I Got You" (Neil Finn, 1980)
DD Smash - "Whaling" (Dave Dobbyn, 1984)
Chris Knox - "Not Given Lightly" (Chris Knox, 1990)
The Chills - "Pink Frost" (Martin Phillipps, 1984)
Crowded House - "Weather With You" (Tim Finn/Neil Finn, 1991)
Fur Patrol - "Lydia" (Julia Deans, 2000)
Hello Sailor - "Blue Lady" (Graham Brazier, 1977)
Bic Runga - "Drive" (Bic Runga, 1996)
DLT featuring Che Fu - "Chains" (Che Ness/Darryl Thompson/Angus McNaughton/Kevin Rangihuna, 1996)
Shona Laing - "(Glad I'm) Not A Kennedy"
The Crocodiles - "Tears" (Fane Flaws/Arthur Baysting, 1980)
Th' Dudes - "Be Mine Tonight" (Dave Dobbyn/Ian Morris, 1978)
Split Enz - "I See Red" (Tim Finn, 1979)
Shihad - "Home Again" (Karl Kippenberger/Tom Larkin/Phil Knight/Jon Toogood, 1997)
DD Smash - "Outlook For Thursday" (Dave Dobbyn/DD Smash, 1983)
OMC - "How Bizarre" (Alan Jansson/Pauly Fuemana, 1995)
Dave Dobbyn - "Language" (Dave Dobbyn, 1994)
Split Enz - "Message to My Girl" (Neil Finn, 1984)
The Feelers - "Venus" (James Reid, 1998)
Tim Finn - "Fraction Too Much Friction" (Tim Finn, 1983)
Herbs - "French Letter" (Tony Fonoti/Spencer Fusimalohi/Dilworth Karaka, 1995)
Sharon O'Neill - "Maxine" (Sharon O'Neill, 1983)
Stellar* - "Violent" (Boh Runga, 1999)
The Exponents - "Why Does Love Do This To Me?" (Jordan Luck, 1992)
Shona Laing - "1905" (Shona Laing, 1972)
Th' Dudes - "Bliss" (Dave Dobbyn/Ian Morris, 1979)
Netherworld Dancing Toys - "For Today" (Nick Sampson/Malcolm Black, 1984)
King Kapisi - "Screems From Tha Old Plantation" (Bill Urale/Kas Futialo, 2000)
Mi-Sex - "Blue Day" (Murray Burns/Colin Bayley, 1985)
Zed - "Glorafilia" (Ben Campbell/Nathan King/Adrian Palmer, 1999)
Split Enz - "History Never Repeats" (Neil Finn, 1981)
Sisters Underground - "In The Neighbourhood" (Alan Jansson/Hassanah Orogbu/Brenda Makaoeafi, 1994)
Shihad - "Pacifier" (Karl Kippenberger/Tom Larkin/Phil Knight/Jon Toogood, 1999)
Bic Runga - "Bursting Through" (Bic Runga, 1997)
Greg Johnson - "Liberty" (Greg Johnson, 1997)
Strawpeople - Sweet Disorder "Paul Casserly/Mark Tierney/Anthony Ioasa, 1994)
Hello Sailor - "Gutter Black"
Herbs - "Long Ago" (Lundon/Hona, 1984)
Dave Dobbyn - "You Oughta Be In Love" (Dave Dobbyn, 1986)
Fur Patrol - "Andrew"
Bic Runga - "Suddenly Strange" (Bic Runga, 1997)
The Mockers - "Forever Tuesday Morning" (Gary Curtis/Andrew Fagan/Tim Wedde, 1984)
Headless Chickens - "Cruise Control" (Chris Matthews/Michael Lawry, 1991)
Peking Man - "Room That Echoes" (Neville Hall, 1985)
Herbs - "Sensitive To A Smile" (Dilworth Karaka/Tumahai, 1987)
Dance Exponents - "I'll Say Goodbye (Even Tho I'm Blue)" (Jordan Luck, 1983)
Sharon O'Neill - "Maybe" (Sharon O'Neill, 1981)
Eye TV - "One Day Ahead" (Sean Sturm/Luke Casey/Michael Scott/Grant Winterburn, 2000)
Zed - "Renegade Fighter" (Ben Campbell/Nathan King, 2000)
Stellar* - "Part of Me" (Boh Runga, 1999)
Coconut Rough - "Sierra Leone" (Andrew McLennan, 1983)
Sharon O'Neill - "Words" (Sharon O'Neill, 1979)
Shona Laing - "Mercy of Love" (Shona Laing, 1992)
Supergroove - "Can't Get Enough" (Joseph Fisher/Karl Steven, 1996)

Critical reception
Critics noted some notable omissions from the Top 30 such as the number one song "Nature", and all except one of the voted Crowded House songs.

References

See also
 Top 100 New Zealand Songs of All Time
 Nature's Best

Nature's Best
2004 video albums
Music video compilation albums
2004 compilation albums